Matthew Halliday (born 23 January 1987) is an English professional footballer who plays for Lowestoft Town. Halliday was born in Norwich and joined Norwich City as a trainee. In February 2006 he joined Hereford United on loan, although this was technically classed as work experience due to him still being a trainee. He made the bench at Hereford, but did not make a first team appearance for the Bulls. Along with fellow trainees Andrew Cave-Brown, Robert Eagle and Andrew Fisk, Halliday was offered a professional contract in April 2006. All four, plus a further trainee Michael Spillane signed their professional contracts on 1 July 2006.

Halliday made his debut for the Norwich first team as a late substitute in a League Cup match against Torquay United on 23 August 2006, when he replaced injured captain Adam Drury. He was unable to break into the first team again in the 2006/07 season however and joined Torquay on loan on 25 January 2007 along with teammate Rossi Jarvis. He made his league debut, for Torquay, on 10 February 2007, playing in the 1–0 defeat away to Lincoln City. He played twice more for Torquay within the next ten days, in defeats at home to Hartlepool United and away to Rochdale before returning to Norwich at the end of his one-month loan.

At the end of the 2006–07 season, Halliday signed a new one-year contract, however his contract was not renewed beyond the end of the 2007–08 season and he was one of nine players released by manager Glenn Roeder. He had trials in 2008 pre-season with Cambridge United and Northampton Town, but in September 2008 signed for Wroxham. In the summer of 2009 he signed for Lowestoft Town following the club's promotion to the Isthmian League Division One North. He remained at Lowestoft until May 2012 before returning to Wroxham as well as managing their U18s.

References

External links

 Profile at Flown from the nest

Living people
1987 births
Footballers from Norwich
English footballers
Norwich City F.C. players
Hereford United F.C. players
Torquay United F.C. players
Wroxham F.C. players
Lowestoft Town F.C. players
English Football League players
Association football defenders